The John T. and Margaret Nichols House is located in Allouez, Wisconsin.

History
The design of the house was inspired by Frank Lloyd Wright's 'Usonia'. It was added to both the State and the National Register of Historic Places in 2005.

References

Houses on the National Register of Historic Places in Wisconsin
National Register of Historic Places in Brown County, Wisconsin
Modern Movement architecture in the United States
Houses completed in 1951